Kalkaska County is located in the U.S. state of Michigan. As of the 2020 Census, the population was 17,939. The county seat is Kalkaska.

Kalkaska County is included in the Traverse City Micropolitan Statistical Area. Although it is located on Michigan's Lower Peninsula, Kalkaska County is considered part of Northern Michigan.

History

Kalkaska County, originally named Wabassee County, was separated from Michilimackinac County in 1840, renamed in 1843. In 1851, Kalkaska County was attached to Grand Traverse County for legal purposes. The first settler in Kalkaska County was William Copeland, from England, who purchased land in the northwest corner of the county in 1855. Kalkaska County was organized in its own right on January 27, 1871. Crawford County was then temporarily attached to Kalkaska County for legal purposes.

The discovery of substantial deposits of oil and natural gas resulted in the construction of a processing plant by Shell Oil Company in 1973 and a major economic boom in the community.

Etymology 
The county's name is a pseudo-Native American word coined by Henry Schoolcraft, a Michigan geographer and ethnologist. The name is thought to be a Chippewa word meaning flat or burned-over country. An alternative theory is that this is a neologism or neonym created by Henry Schoolcraft, originally spelled Calcasca. Some theorists suggest this is word play.  Schoolcraft's family name had been Calcraft, and the Ks may have been added to make the name appear more like a Native American word.

Geography

Kalkaska Sand, the state soil of Michigan, was named after the county because of the large amounts deposited in the area from glaciers in the Ice Age.

Much of the county is marshland. This makes it one of the more uneven counties in the Lower Peninsula.

The Pere Marquette State Forest covers much of the county. Glaciers shaped the area, creating a unique regional ecosystem. A large portion of the area is the Grayling outwash plain, a broad outwash plain including sandy ice-disintegration ridges; jack pine barrens, some white pine-red pine forest, and northern hardwood forest. Large lakes were created by glacial action.

Lakes

Torch Lake
Starvation Lake
Lake Skegemog
Bear Lake
Manistee Lake
Grass Lake
Rainbow Lake
Blue Lake
Cub Lake
Twin Lake
Little Twin Lake
Pickerel Lake
Squaw Lake
Indian Lake
Perch Lake
Crawford Lake
Lost Lake
Johnson Rd Lake
Log Lake
Selkirk Lake
Kettle Lake
Lake Placid
Sand Lake
Twenty Eight Lakes
East Lake
Long Lake
Lake Five
 Wheeler Lake
Fife Lake

Rivers

Boardman River
Little Rapid River
Manistee River
Rapid River
Torch River

Major highways
 – runs NE through the western part of the county. Enters at 4 miles (6.4 km) north of SW corner; exits into Antrim County near midpoint of north county line.
 – runs north–south through west-central part of county. Passes Kalkaska.
 – runs east and ESE through middle portion of county. Passes Kalkaska.

Adjacent counties

Antrim County – north
Otsego County – northeast
Crawford County – east
Roscommon County – southeast
Missaukee County – south
Wexford County – southwest
Grand Traverse County – west

Demographics

As of the 2010 United States Census there were 16,571 people, 6,428 households, and 4,634 families residing in the county. There were 10,822 housing units at an average density of 19 per square mile (7/km2). The racial makeup of the county was 98.44% White, 0.21% Black or African American, 0.78% Native American, 0.22% Asian, 0.05% Pacific Islander, 0.10% from other races, 0.86% of the population were Hispanic or Latino of any race. 24.6% were of German, 12.4% English, 10.4% Irish, 10.0% American, 6.3% Polish and 5.1% French ancestry. 98.8% spoke English as their first language.

There were 6,428 households, out of which 31.70% had children under the age of 18 living with them, 58.60% were married couples living together, 9.00% had a female householder with no husband present, and 27.90% were non-families. 22.30% of all households were made up of individuals, and 8.20% had someone living alone who was 65 years of age or older. The average household size was 2.55 and the average family size was 2.95.

The county population contained 25.60% under the age of 18, 7.60% from 18 to 24, 28.60% from 25 to 44, 24.50% from 45 to 64, and 13.70% who were 65 years of age or older. The median age was 38 years. For every 100 females, there were 101.30 males. For every 100 females age 18 and over, there were 98.90 males.

The median income for a household in the county was $36,072, and the median income for a family was $39,932. Males had a median income of $31,860 versus $20,455 for females. The per capita income for the county was $16,309. About 8.20% of families and 10.50% of the population were below the poverty line, including 14.20% of those under age 18 and 7.00% of those age 65 or over.

Government
Kalkaska County voters have been reliably Republican from the start. They have selected the Republican Party nominee in 85% of national elections (29 of 35).

The county government operates the jail, maintains rural roads, operates the major local courts, records deeds, mortgages, and vital records, administers public health regulations, and participates with the state in the provision of social services. The county board of commissioners controls the budget and has limited authority to make laws or ordinances. In Michigan, most local government functions—police and fire, building and zoning, tax assessment, street maintenance, etc.—are the responsibility of individual cities and townships.

Events
The National Trout Festival is an annual festival since 1936, held in April. It notes the heritage and sportsmanship of Kalkaska.

Communities

Village
 Kalkaska (county seat)

Civil townships

 Bear Lake Township
 Blue Lake Township
 Boardman Township
 Clearwater Township
 Coldsprings Township
 Excelsior Township
 Garfield Township
 Kalkaska Township
 Oliver Township
 Orange Township
 Rapid River Township
 Springfield Township

Former townships 

 Glade Township
 Wilson Township

Census-designated places
 Bear Lake
 Manistee Lake
 Rapid City
 South Boardman

Unincorporated communities
 Barker Creek
 Crofton
 Darragh
 Lodi
 Sigma
 Spencer
 Torch River

Ghost towns 

 Aarwood
 Amity
 Clearwater
 Cold Spring
 Culver
 Dowen
 Excelsior
 Fletcher
 France
 Ivan
 Kaska
 Leetsville
 McGee
 Rugg
 Sharon

See also 
 List of Michigan State Historic Sites in Kalkaska County, Michigan
 Westwood Cemetery (Michigan)

References

Further reading
Kalkaska Genealogical Society: Big Trout, Black Gold: History of Kalkaska County MI

External links

 
Michigan counties
Traverse City micropolitan area
1871 establishments in Michigan
Populated places established in 1871